Local elections were held in Kosovo on 22 October 2017. Only 19 municipalities elected a mayor in the first round, and 19 voted again on 19 November 2017.

Electoral system 
The Mayor and the members of the Assembly were elected by open list proportional representation, with seats reserved for national minorities, in each Kosovo municipalities

Parties and coalitions  

The Central Election Commission had certified for municipal elections on October 22, 91 political subjects, of which 35 political parties, one coalition, 30 civic initiatives and 25 independent candidates.

Elected mayors

Election results

Prishtina

Prizren

Ferizaj

Gjilan

Peja

Gjakova

Podujeva

Mitrovica District

Leposavić

Mitrovica

North Mitrovica

Skenderaj

Vushtrri

Zubin Potok

Zvečan

Second round

Prishtina

Prizren

Ferizaj

Gjilan

Gjakova

Podujeva

Mitrovica

Agim Bahtiri left the New Kosovo Alliance in 2019 and joined Vetëvendosje.

Vushtrri

References

2017 elections in Europe
2017 in Kosovo
2017
June 2017 events in Europe